Adeline Saintilmond (born 14 December 1984) is a Haitian former footballer who played as a forward. She has been a member of the Haiti women's national team.

Club career
Saintilmond has played for Valentina FC in Haiti and for Quebec Dynamo ARSQ in Canada.

International career
Saintilmond capped for Haiti at senior level during the 2010 Central American and Caribbean Games, the 2010 CONCACAF Women's World Cup Qualifying and the 2012 CONCACAF Women's Olympic Qualifying Tournament.

International goals
Scores and results list Haiti' goal tally first.

References

1984 births
Living people
Haitian women's footballers
Women's association football forwards
Haiti women's international footballers
Competitors at the 2010 Central American and Caribbean Games
Haitian expatriate footballers
Haitian expatriate sportspeople in Canada
Expatriate women's soccer players in Canada